The Institutional Stock Exchange, commonly known as BIVA, is Mexico's second stock exchange, based in Mexico City. BIVA began operations on 25 July 2018 and trades the same instruments as the other exchange in Mexico, the Bolsa Mexicana de Valores: equities, debts, warrants and some Mexican-specific instruments such as CKDs and FIBRAs.

History
On 29 August 2017, President Enrique Peña Nieto presented Santiago Urquiza Luna Parra, president of BIVA's parent company Cencor, with the concession to open and operate a new stock exchange in Mexico, the Bolsa Institucional de Valores (BIVA). The concession itself was published the same day in the Diario Oficial de la Federación.

The stock exchange commenced operations on 25 July 2018, ending the 43-year monopoly of the BMV in the Mexican stock exchange market. The exchange's first opening bell was rung in a ceremony at the Altar de la Patria in Mexico City.

See also  
Mexican Stock Exchange
List of stock exchanges in the Americas
List of Mexican companies
Economy of Mexico
Mexican peso

References 

Financial services companies of Mexico
Financial services companies established in 2017
Mexican companies established in 2017
Stock exchanges in Mexico